Esther Cremer (born 29 March 1988 in Cologne) is a German athlete who specialises in the 400 metres.

She came fifth in the 2009 World Championships in Athletics – Women's 4 × 400 metres relay, and won silver relay medals at the 2009 European Athletics U23 Championships and the 2010 European Team Championships.

Competition record

References

External links 
 
 
 
 
 
 

1988 births
Living people
Athletes from Cologne
German female sprinters
German national athletics champions
Athletes (track and field) at the 2012 Summer Olympics
Olympic athletes of Germany
European Athletics Championships medalists
Olympic female sprinters